Intifada – The Long Day of Rage is a book by Scottish journalist David Pratt documenting violence between Palestinians and Israelis in Gaza and the West Bank between 2000 and 2001.

Summary 
Set in 2000 and 2001 in Palestine, Pratt documents the formulaic way that violence is dispensed in Palestine by Palestinian youth and Israeli Defense Forces during the 2000 and 2001 Palestinian uprisings, or Intifadas. 

In the foreword, Pratt is open about his struggle to remain impartial and while he notes that both sides see themselves as victims, he is critical of the State of Israel from the start and states his conviction that the Palestinian people remain the victims of "a great injustice". Raymond Deane quotes Pratt in his review: “this book makes no pretence towards impartiality…because the weight of evidence which as a reporter I have come across over considerable time, convinces me that the State of Israel has a case to answer for in its appalling treatment of the Palestinian people.” However the book does presents the Intifadas from both perspectives and includes reporting on writing about the Intifadas by Israeli writers A.B. Yehoshua, David Grossman, and Amos Oz. 

The book includes criticism of the Palestine Liberation Organization (PLO) and the Palestinian Authority. It discusses complicity between the PLO and the state of Israel and their collective failure to deal with the revolutionary events.  The criticism of Yasser Arafat is strong.

The book presents the Oslo Accords as insincere agreements and the second Intifada as counterproductive, linking it to both the election of Ariel Sharon and the rise of Islamism in Palestine, which it describes as being supported by Israel.

Critical reception 
The book is described by Jason Burke as highly readable; he describes the narrative as "accessible, colorful and informed".

Philip Connolly, writing in An Phoblacht, praises Pratt for his straight talking and for avoiding political hyperbole.

Raymond Deane describes the conclusion of the book as eloquent and describes the book as one of the most "informative books of its kind." due to its detail and clarity.

See also 

B’Tselem

References 

2006 non-fiction books
Books about war
Books about Israel
Israeli–Palestinian conflict books
Books about the Palestinian National Authority